During the 1996–97 English football season, Wrexham F.C. competed in the Football League Second Division.

Season summary
In the 1996–97 season, Wrexham set off on another amazing run in the FA Cup and beating more top flight opposition. Following wins at Colwyn Bay and Scunthorpe United, they were drawn to play West Ham United at home, the game ending in a 1–1 draw on a snow-covered pitch after a well earned draw. The replay at Upton Park ended in a shock 1–0 win to Wrexham as Kevin Russell scored in the dying minutes to send Wrexham into the fourth round. After also beating Peterborough United and Birmingham City in the following rounds, they played Chesterfield in an all-Division-2 FA Cup quarter final, Wrexham narrowly losing to the Spireites 1–0.

The league campaign began very brightly for Wrexham as they lost only one from their first 17 league matches and were in the play-off places heading to Christmas but then a little decline in form with only seven wins in the second half of the campaign wasn't enough for a play-off position and finished 4 points off the top six.

Final league table

Results
Wrexham's score comes first

Legend

Football League Second Division

FA Cup

League Cup

Football League Trophy

Squad

References

Wrexham A.F.C. seasons
Wrexham
Wrex